Onychogomphus forcipatus, the small pincertail or green-eyed hook-tailed dragonfly, is a species of dragonfly belonging to the family Gomphidae.

Subspecies
Subspecies include:
Onychogomphus forcipatus var. albotibialis  Schmidt, 1954  
Onychogomphus forcipatus var. forcipatus  (Linnaeus, 1758) 
Onychogomphus forcipatus var. unguiculatus  (Vander Linden, 1820)

Distribution
This quite common and widespread dragonfly is present in most of Europe, in North Africa (Algeria, Morocco, Tunisia), in Armenia, Azerbaijan, Iran, Kazakhstan, Lithuania and Turkmenistan.

Habitat
These dragonflies usually inhabit clean rivers with a little faster running water and gravel or sandy banks. Occasionally they are also present at large lakes.

Description
The eyes of these medium-sized dragonflies are widely separated and grey-to-green. The two black lines on the side of the thorax are relatively narrow and touch the midline. It has a yellow line on the vertex and two cells above the anal triangle. The abdomen in males is fitted with three hooks of large size (anal appendages). Cercoids may be dark and have a subterminal tooth. The base of the hindwing is angled in males and rounded in females.

This species is rather similar to Onychogomphus uncatus. The two species can be distinguished on the basis of the shape and extension of the black markings, especially on the thorax and on the last abdominal segments.

Biology
Adults can be encountered close to running water and lakes from June through September. In Southern Europe, the emergence period typically begins in April. In Cyprus, the flight season of the subspecies O. f. albotibialis is from late March to October. This subspecies is callified as a Near-threatened species. After the mating the females lay about 500 eggs into the water. Larvae dig and live buried in the bottom. Their life cycle from egg to imago lasts about 3–5 years.

Gallery

References

Göran Sahlén - Eggshell ultrastructure in Onychogomphus forcipatus unguiculatus (Vander Linden) (Odonata: Gomphidae) - Section of Entomology, Department of Zoology, Uppsala University, Villavägen - International Journal of Insect Morphology and Embryology Volume 24, Issue 3, July 1995, Pages 281-286

External links
 Galerie-insecte 
 SFO-PCV Société Française d'Orchidophilie de Poitou-Charentes et Vendée 
 Linnea 

Gomphidae
Insects described in 1758
Dragonflies of Europe
Taxa named by Carl Linnaeus